Pattalam is a 2003 Malayalam-language film by Lal Jose and starring Mammootty and Biju Menon along with Tessa, Jyothirmai, Jagathy Sreekumar, Oduvil Unnikrishnan and Innocent in supporting roles. The film revolves around incidents in a small village after the army sets up a temporary camp.

Synopsis
An Army unit comes to a local village in Kerala because of a terror threat. The unit is led by Major Pattabhiraman and commander Benny. The Major sees a widow named Vimala singing. Vimala is living in her husband's home after his death. A village girl Satyabhama, and Benny fall in love and elope. Pattabhiraman discovers that a terrorist has planned to pour cyanide into a water tank. He finds the terrorist and destroys the water tank by blasting a bomb terrorist had with him. Benny reveals to Vimala that Pattabhiraman killed her husband Nandu in the war. The Major admits the fact, but claims he did it as a mercy killing because Nandu was so badly injured. Vimala forgives him, and the couple happily unites.

Cast

Mammootty as Major Pattabhiraman 
Biju Menon as Captain Benny 
Tessa Joseph as Vimala
Jyothirmayi as Bhama
Kalabhavan Mani as Moythu Pilakkandi, Panchayat Member
Salim Kumar as S.I. Gabbar Kesavan
Indrajith Sukumaran as Captain Nandakumar
Innocent as Sivasankaran Nair (Father of Bhama)
Jagathy Sreekumar as Kumaran 
 Tini Tom as Krishnanutty, soldier
Mala Aravindan as Ex-military Gopalan 
Oduvil Unnikrishnan as Narayanan 
Mamukkoya as Hamsa, Tea shop owner
Joju George as Sajan, soldier
Sai Kumar as Vishwanathan 
Sudheesh as Suku
Sukumari as Pattabhiraman's Mother 
Zeenath as Kumaran's wife
Ambika Mohan as Bhama's mother(Vishalam)
Bindu Panicker as Panchayat President Sulochana
James as Sulochana's husband
Indrans as Govindan
 Manikandan Pattambi
Major Ravi as Captain Peter
Captain Raju as Colonel Kannappan
 Dinesh Prabhakar
 Idavela Babu as Panickar
 Sudheer Sukumaran as Terrorist

Soundtrack

Lyrics: Gireesh Puthenchery, Music: Vidyasagar. Bits of the song "Aaroral" were used in the song "Konjam Neram" from Chandramukhi.

References

External links
 
 Pattaalam at the Malayalam Movie Database

2000s Malayalam-language films
2000s romantic action films
Indian romantic action films
Films scored by Vidyasagar
Indian Army in films
Films shot in Palakkad
Films directed by Lal Jose